Marius Fiil (21 May 1893 – 29 June 1944) was the inn keeper at Hvidsten Inn and a member of the Danish resistance executed by the German occupying power.

Biography 

Fiil was born in Hvidsten Inn on 21 May 1893 as son of its owner Niels Pedersen (Fiil) and 35-year-old wife Nicoline Mathilde Pedersen and baptized Marius Anton Pedersen Fiil in Gassum church on Trinity Sunday the same year.

In 1917 he married Gudrun Margrethe Kjul Christensen Søvang, in 1918 and 1920 when they had their two first children Kirstine and Niels he was a house proprietor and bicycle dealer.

In 1930 he lived in Hvidsten Inn with his 72-year-old father as inn keeper, his wife, their son and four daughters and a farm hand, a maid and a manager.

In the autumn of 1932 his oldest daughter was confirmed, at that time he and his wife had taken over the inn, and he additionally worked as a rural postman.

During the occupation Fill and his family became the center of a resistance group, the Hvidsten group.

The group helped the British Special Operations Executive parachute weapons and supplies into Denmark for distribution to the resistance.

In March 1944 the Gestapo made an "incredible number of arrests" including in the region of Randers the "nationally known folklore collector and keeper of Hvidsten inn Marius Fiil", his son Niels, his 17-year-old daughter Gerda, his daughter Kirstine and her husband brewery worker Peter Sørensen.

The following month De frie Danske reported on Fiil again, that he along with other arrestees from Hvidsten had been transferred from Randers to Vestre Fængsel.

On 29 June 1944 Fiil, his son Niels, his son-in-law and five other members of the Hvidsten group were executed in Ryvangen.

After his death 

On 15 July 1944 De frie Danske reported on the execution of Fiil, his son and son in law, the life sentence of his older daughter and the two-year sentence of his younger daughter and compared Fiil to Svend Gønge and Niels Ebbesen while lamenting the profound loss of Fiil's widow. Six months later the January 1945 issue of the resistance newspaper Frit Danmark (Free Denmark) reported that on 29 June the previous year Fiil and seven other named members of the Hvidsten group had been executed.

On 2 July 1945 the remains and Fiil and his son were found in Ryvangen and transferred to the Department of Forensic Medicine of the university of Copenhagen. The remains of the six other executed members of the group were found in the same area three days later.

On 5 July an inquest in the Department of Forensic Medicine of the university of Copenhagen showed that Fiil was executed with gunshot wounds to the chest.

On 10 July he was together with the seven other executed group members cremated at Bispebjerg Cemetery.

In 1945 a memorial stone over the eight executed members of the Hvidsten group was raised near Hvidsten Inn.

Similarly a larger memorial stone for resistance members including the eight executed members of the Hvidsten group has been laid down in Ryvangen Memorial Park.

Portrayal in the media
 In the 2012 Danish drama film Hvidsten Gruppen (This Life) Marius Fiil is portrayed by Jens Jørn Spottag.

References 

 
 

1893 births
1944 deaths
Danish people executed by Nazi Germany
Danish people of World War II
Danish resistance members
Resistance members killed by Nazi Germany